The 1987 Appalachian State Mountaineers football team was an American football team that represented Appalachian State University as a member of the Southern Conference (SoCon) during the 1987 NCAA Division I-AA football season. In their fourth year under head coach Sparky Woods, the Mountaineers compiled an overall record of 11–3 with a conference mark of 7–0, winning the SoCon title. Appalachian State advanced to the NCAA Division I-AA Football Championship playoffs, where they beat Richmond in the first round and Georgia Southern in the quarterfinals before falling to Marshall in the semifinals.

Schedule

References

Appalachian State
Appalachian State Mountaineers football seasons
Southern Conference football champion seasons
Appalachian State Mountaineers football